Aviv Barzelay (born 28 May 2002) is an Israeli swimmer.

Early life
Barzelay was born and raised in Mitzpe Aviv, Israel, to a Jewish family. Her parents are Mirit and Yuval.

2020 Tokyo Olympics 
Barzelay was invited to represent Israel at the 2020 Summer Olympics after breaking the Israeli record in the 200-meter backstroke event in a championship in Rome, even though the swimmer fell short of meeting the Olympic qualifying time. She competed in the Women's 200m backstroke event.

Career highlights

References

External links
 
 

2002 births
Living people
Swimmers at the 2020 Summer Olympics
Olympic swimmers of Israel
Israeli female swimmers
Israeli Jews
Jewish swimmers